Michel Gueguen (born 27 February 1951) is a French modern pentathlete. He competed at the 1972 and 1976 Summer Olympics.

References

1951 births
Living people
French male modern pentathletes
Olympic modern pentathletes of France
Modern pentathletes at the 1972 Summer Olympics
Modern pentathletes at the 1976 Summer Olympics